Xplodera mig 2000 is the second solo album from Swedish rock musician Joakim Thåström and it was released in 1991. On this album he decided to make a drastic change in his musical style and make some harder and more filthier kind of rock. This was probably a build up album, musically, to his next project: Peace Love & Pitbulls.

Track listing
Radio Thåström - 3:25
Ich liebe dich - 4:19
Elektrisk - 4:40 (Electric)
Elvis Presley för en dag - 4:40 (Elvis Presley For A Day)
King Kong - 3:10
Miss Huddinge -72 - 5:07
Alla har fel (igen) - 3:16 (Everybody Is Wrong (Again))
Xplodera Mig (Thåström, Peter Puders, Sankan Sandqvist) - 4:40 (Xplode Me)
Fuzzbox - 4:20
Ballad i P-moll - 5:48 (Ballad In P-Minor Scale)

All songs by Joakim Thåström except where it's noted.

Personnel
Joakim Thåström - Lead vocals, guitars
Chips Kiesbye - Guitar
Peter Puders - Guitar
Sankan Sandqvist - drums, backing vocals
Anna-Karin Andersson - Jingle
Fjodor - vocals
Carla Jonsson - vocals
Jonas Lindgren - Violin
Anders Karlén - Guitar
Peter Sandqvist - Pere FX
Jocke Ekström - Saxophone
Martin Thors - backing vocals
Stefan Björk - Bass
Sator - backing vocals
Einar Heckscher - Talking
Henryk Lipp - Choir arrangements, synthesizer
Michael Ilbert - String arrangements, programming
Fläskkvartetten - Strings

Singles
1991 - Alla har fel
1991 - Xplodera Mig

1991 albums
Joakim Thåström albums